was a Nippon Professional Baseball pitcher.

He was named Pacific League Rookie of the Year in 1950. In 1953, he pitched a complete-game victory over the American All-Stars. He was inducted in the Japanese Baseball Hall of Fame in 1985.

References 

1926 births
1971 deaths
Baseball people from Ōita Prefecture
Japanese baseball players
Nippon Professional Baseball pitchers
Daimai Orions players
Mainichi Orions players
Hankyu Braves players
Nippon Professional Baseball Rookie of the Year Award winners
Nippon Professional Baseball coaches
Japanese baseball coaches
Japanese Baseball Hall of Fame inductees